Dutch-Hungarian relations are foreign relations between the Netherlands and Hungary. The Netherlands have an embassy in Budapest and an honorary consulate in Pécs. Hungary has an embassy in The Hague and 6 honorary consulates (in Amsterdam, Arnhem, Aerdenhout, Winsum, 's-Hertogenbosch and Curaçao).

Both countries are full members of NATO and of the European Union.
the Netherlands has given full support to Hungary's membership in the European Union and NATO.

Diplomacy

Hungary
The Hague (Embassy)
Amsterdam (Honorary consulate)
Arnhem (Honorary consulate)
Aerdenhout (Honorary consulate)
Winsum (Honorary consulate)
's-Hertogenbosch (Honorary consulate)
Curaçao (Honorary consulate)

Netherlands
Budapest (Embassy)
Pécs (Honorary consulate)

See also 
 Foreign relations of Hungary
 Foreign relations of the Netherlands
 Hungarians in the Netherlands
 Dutchs in Hungary
 Accession of Hungary to the European Union

References

External links 
Dutch Ministry of Foreign Affairs about the relation with Hungary
Dutch embassy in Budapest 
Hungarian embassy in The Hague 

 

 
Bilateral relations of the Netherlands
Netherlands